The 2023 Northwestern State Demons football team will represent Northwestern State University as a member of the Southland Conference during the 2023 NCAA Division I FCS football season. Led by sixth-year head coach Brad Laird, the Demons will play their home games at Harry Turpin Stadium in Natchitoches, Louisiana.

Schedule

References

Northwestern State Demons
Northwestern State Demons football seasons
Northwestern State Demons